Ciarka  in Polish and Schiorke in German, is a village in the administrative district of Gmina Lasowice Wielkie, within Kluczbork County, Opole Voivodeship, in south-western Poland.

References

Ciarka